A radiologic sign is an objective indication of some medical fact (that is, a medical sign) that is detected by a physician during radiologic examination with medical imaging (for example, via an X-ray, CT scan, MRI scan, or sonographic scan).

Examples

 Double decidual sac sign
 Face of the giant panda sign
 Football sign
 Golden S sign
 Hampton's hump
 Hilum overlay sign
 Kerley lines
 Mickey Mouse sign
 Omental cake
 Peribronchial cuffing
 Pneumatosis intestinalis
 Rigler's sign
 Westermark sign

See also
 List of radiologic signs
 Radiologists Without Borders

References